The following lists the top 25 singles of 2003  in Australia from the Australian Recording Industry Association (ARIA) End of Year singles chart.

"Angels Brought Me Here" by Guy Sebastian was the biggest song of the year, peaking at #1 for three weeks and staying in the top 50 for 12 weeks. The longest stay at #1 was by Eminem with "Lose Yourself" which spent 8 weeks at the top spot in 2003, and 4 weeks in 2002.

References

Australian record charts
2003 in Australian music
Australia singles